Hateruma (波照間島; Hateruma-jima; Yaeyama: Patirooma, Hateruma dialect: Besїma "our island", Okinawan: Hatiruma, Northern Ryukyuan:  Patara) is an island in the Yaeyama District of Okinawa Prefecture, Japan. It is the southernmost inhabited island in Japan.

Hateruma, which is composed of corals, has  of area and approximately 600 inhabitants. The primary products of the island include sugarcane, pineapple, refined sugar, and Awanami, a type of the alcoholic beverage awamori. Its southern location makes it one of the few places in Japan where the Southern Cross can be observed.

Tourism 
Hateruma is frequently visited by tourists from Ishigaki on day trips, as it boasts the southernmost tip of land of Japan. In addition, the southernmost school and the southernmost police station of Japan are tourist attractions. In the only village, several well-preserved old houses showing the traditional architecture with a hip roof, red tiles and a shisa statue on the top can be seen. Many old houses are still surrounded by a thick wall consisting of dark coral stones. On the south coast, there is a monument indicating the southernmost tip of land of Japan.

Climate
Hateruma has a tropical rainforest climate (Af according to the Köppen climate classification), because all twelve months have a mean temperature of at least .

Hateruma receives  of precipitation annually. Precipitation is abundant year-round, with every month receiving at least  of rain. Typhoons often bring heavy rain, so Hateruma receives more precipitation at the peak of the typhoon season. September is the wettest month, receiving  of rain on average. February is the driest month, receiving  of rainfall. There are a similar amount of precipitation days each month, with April having the least with 8.3 and January having the most with 11.6 days. Hateruma receives 1965.8 hours of sunshine annually, with summer being the sunniest season and winter being the least sunny season.
<div style="width:100%;">

Infrastructure 
Hateruma Airport is located on the island, but is not currently served by any commercial flights. Haterujima is accessible by ferry from Ishigaki several times a day.

Education 

The Taketomi town authorities maintain a single combined elementary and junior high school on the island: Hateruma Elementary and Junior High School (竹富町立波照間小中学校).

For public senior high school students may attend schools of the Okinawa Prefectural Board of Education.

See also
 Geography of Japan
 Japanese Archipelago
 List of extreme points of Japan
 Okinotorishima

References

Bibliography 

 Yamakei: Ryukyu Nansei Shoto, p. 120-121. Tokio 2003.

External links 
 美しき島々 ～波照間島～ (Japanese page)
 美ら島物語 波照間島情報  (Japanese page)

Extreme points of Japan
Yaeyama Islands
Islands of Okinawa Prefecture